The Poznań–Skandawa railway is a  railway line in Poland. It connects Poznań with Inowrocław, Toruń,  and Olsztyn, then continues to the Polish-Russian border at Skandawa, Kaliningrad Oblast.

Opening
The line was opened in stages between 1871 and 1873.

Closure
The line between Korsze and Żeleznodorożnyj became single track from 1 January 1945.

On 12 March 2000 the line between Skandawa and Żeleznodorożnyj was closed to passenger traffic and on 3 April 2000 also between Korsze and Skandawa.

Electrification
Electrification took place in six stages between 1976 and 1990:

23 December 1976 - electrification of section Poznań Wschód – Inowrocław
20 December 1983 - electrification of section Inowrocław – Toruń Główny
16 October 1986 - electrification of section of Toruń Wschodni – Iława Główna
13 December 1987 - electrification of section of the Toruń Główny – Toruń Wschodni
3 October 1988 - electrification of section Iława Główna – Olsztyn Główny
18 December 1990 - electrification of section Olsztyn Główny - Korsze

Modernisation
On 3 October 2016 PKP PLK signed a contract with ZUE for the modernisation of part of Line 353 on the section Ostrowite - Biskupiec Pomorski and Biskupiec Pomorski - Jamielnik within the project "Work on Line 353 on the section Jabłonowo Pom. - Iława - Olsztyn - Korsze". Work will start in October 2017.

Usage
The line sees trains of various categories (EuroCity, Express InterCity, Intercity, TLK and regional services).

EuroCity services from Berlin to Gdynia between Poznań Wschód and Inowrocław
Express Intercity, Intercity and TLK services along the route between Poznań Wschód, Inowrocław (for Bydgoszcz and Gdańsk), Toruń, Olsztyn and Korsze (for Elk)
Regional services
Przewozy Regionalne along the whole route
Koleje Wielkopolskie between Poznań Wschód and Gniezno

See also 
 Railway lines of Poland

References

 This article is based upon a translation of the Polish language version as of October 2016.

External links 

Railway lines in Poland
Railway lines opened in 1871